Events in the year 2016 in Sudan.

Incumbents
President: Omar al-Bashir
Vice President:
 Bakri Hassan Saleh (First)
 Hassabu Mohamed Abdalrahman (Second)

Events
War in Darfur continues

Sport
5-21 August – Sudan at the 2016 Summer Olympics: 6 competitors in 3 sports

Deaths

5 March – Hassan Al-Turabi, religious and political leader (b. 1932).

19 March – Zeinab Elobeid Yousif, aircraft engineer (b. 1952).

References

 
2010s in Sudan
Years of the 21st century in Sudan
Sudan
Sudan